Paratrechiotes ocydromoides is a species of beetle in the family Carabidae, the only species in the genus Paratrechiotes.

References

Trechinae